Micola is an unincorporated community in Pemiscot County, in the U.S. state of Missouri.

History
Micola was originally called Pokono, and under the latter had its start in 1901 when the railroad was extended to that point. A post office called Micola was established in 1902, and remained in operation until 1926. The present name is a fanciful amalgamation of Michie and Coleman, the surnames of the original owners of the town site.

References

Unincorporated communities in Pemiscot County, Missouri
Unincorporated communities in Missouri